Regobarrosia flavescens is a moth in the family Erebidae. It was described by Francis Walker in 1856. It is found in French Guiana, Brazil, Amazonas, Ecuador and Bolivia.

References

Moths described in 1856
Phaegopterina